Mongo Introduces La Lupe is an album by La Lupe and the Mongo Santamaria Orchestra. It was recorded at the Plaza Sound Studios in New York City and released by Riverside Records in 1963. AllMusic gave the album a rating of four stars. Reviewer Scott Yanow called it "an excellent set of stirring Afro-Cuban jazz."

Track listing
Side A
 "Besito Pa Ti" (Santamaria) [4:39]
 "Kiniqua" (Antar Daly) [4:19]
 "Canta Bajo" (Pat Patrick) [3:35]
 "Uncle Calypso" (Armando Peraza) [3:27]
 "Montuneando" (Santamaria, Hernandez) [4:01]

Side B
 "Que Lindas Son" (Santamaria) [4:38]
 "Oye Este Guaguanco" (Isaac Irrizary) [2:45]
 "Este Mambo (This Is My Mambo)" (Rene Hernandez) [4:39]
 "Quiet Stroll" (Patrick) [7:59]

Credits
 La Lupe - vocals (tracks: A1, A3, A5, B2, B3)
 Mongo Santamaria - conga and bongo drums
 Marty Sheller - trumpet
 "Chocolate" Armenteras - trumpet (tracks: A5, B1)
 Bobby Capers - flute, saxophone
 Pat Patrick - flute, saxophone
 Victor Venegas - bass
 Rene Hernandez - piano
 Rodgers Grant - piano (tracks: A4, B4)
 Frank Valerino - Latin percussion
 Kako - Latin percussion
 Osvaldo Martinez - Latin percussion

References

1963 albums
Riverside Records albums